Daniel Kollar (born 29 March 1994) is a Finnish professional footballer who plays for HIFK, as a goalkeeper. His father is Hungarian, and he also holds Hungarian citizenship.

References

1994 births
Living people
Finnish footballers
Pallohonka players
FC Honka players
AC Kajaani players
Kemi City F.C. players
PK-35 Vantaa (men) players
IF Gnistan players
HIFK Fotboll players
Kakkonen players
Ykkönen players
Veikkausliiga players
Association football goalkeepers
Finnish people of Hungarian descent